The Man Who Broke Britain is a 2004 BBC Television drama about a financial collapse triggered by a devastating terrorist strike.

Plot
A devastating terrorist strike wipes out much of Saudi Arabia's oil production; the same day a trader of Saudi origin disappears from the fictional UK investment bank Sun First Credit (SFCB). Managers soon discover the missing trader, Samir Badr, has built up crippling debts, multiplied a hundredfold by the attacks in Saudi. SFCB, once the toast of the city, is suddenly heading for bankruptcy, taking a whole raft of other banks with it. The resulting market crash and banking crisis will push Britain and the US into a 21st Century recession: pension funds are slashed, unemployment soars and the housing market collapses. Following the discovery that Badr has committed suicide, a new Al-Qa'eda tape surfaces, in which Osama Bin Laden appears to claim responsibility for the financial turmoil. Suspicion grows that Badr was an Islamic extremist who deliberately sabotaged the bank. As the authorities and the media launch a massive investigation into the apparent Al-Qaeda assault on the pillars of the Western Economy, an alternative explanation emerges. Could greed and incompetence be the real cause of the collapse of Britain's economy?

External links 
 Production website at Wall to Wall Media
 
 
 The Man Who Broke Britain at British Film Institute

British docufiction films
BBC television docudramas
Films set in the United Kingdom
2004 television films
2004 films
2004 in British television
British television films
Films about terrorism in Asia
Films about terrorism in Europe
2000s British films